Saint-Servais is a north-west district of the city of Namur, Wallonia, located in the province of Namur, Belgium. 

It was a separate municipality until the fusion of the municipalities in 1977.

External links
 

Sub-municipalities of Namur (city)
Former municipalities of Namur (province)